The One Tour was the third concert tour by Canadian American recording artist, Alanis Morissette. The tour was a continuation of the previous Junkie Tour. In contrast to Alanis's previous tours, she performed in places she had never toured (or rarely toured) before across Europe, North America and parts of Asia. In each city, she selected an ambassador through a website contest on "Z.com", to show her around and teach her the culture.

The October 6 show at the Monument Valley, in Navajo Nation was filmed as a part of the "Music in High Places" series. The full show was released on DVD/VHS, titled "Live in the Navajo Nation", on August 27, 2002.

Setlist
This set list is representative of the performance in Zeebrugge. It does not represent all concerts for the duration of the tour.
"Building Steam with a Grain of Salt" (Intro)
"Baba"
"All I Really Want"
"Joining You"
"Would Not Come"
"Hand in My Pocket"
"So Pure"
"Sympathetic Character"
"Your House"
"You Learn"
"Forgiven"
"That I Would Be Good"
"You Oughta Know"
"Uninvited"
Encore 1
"Thank U"
"Wake Up"
Encore 2
"One"
"Ironic"

Tour dates

Festivals
This concert is a part of Belfort Festival
This concert is a part of Out in the Green Festival
This concert is a part of Monza Rock Festival
This concert is a part of Lucca Summer Festival
This concert is a part of Vilar de Mouros Festival
This concert is a part of Beach Festival

Personnel
 Alanis Morissette – vocals/guitar/harmonica
 Joel Shearer – guitar
 Jeffrey Young – keyboards
 Nick Lashley - guitar
 Chris Chaney – bass guitar
 Gary Novak – drums

References

2000 concert tours
Alanis Morissette concert tours